Maharashtra Swabhiman Paksha was founded by Narayan Rane on October 17, 2018. The party was indicated to ally with Bharatiya Janata Party. It was registered in the ECI in December 2018

In 2018, he declared support for Bharatiya Janata Party, and was elected to the Rajya Sabha on a BJP nomination.

Merger With BJP
Maharashtra Swabhiman Paksha led by Narayan Rane merged with the  Bharatiya Janata Party  on October 15, 2019, at Kankavli in presence of Maharasthra Chief Minister Devendra Fadnavis

Electoral Performance

Lok Sabha Elections

References

Indian nationalist political parties
Political parties established in 2018
2018 establishments in Maharashtra
Political parties in Maharashtra